Kallepia (also known as Kallepeia Village) is a village in the Paphos District of Cyprus, located 2 km south of Letymvou. The village of Moro Nero is part of the municipality. It receives  of rainfall annually.

Topography 

Kallepia is a mountainous settlement at an altitude of 490 meters with a pluralistic scenery of mountains, cliffs, wild vegetation and cultivated land with vineyards, apple trees, lemon trees, orange trees, almonds, carob trees, grain and a few olive trees. It has approximately 200 inhabitants and is considered among the first wine-producing villages of the province of Paphos. It is a popular destination with many cottages belonging to both local and foreign visitors who come at weekends and in the summer. The river Ezousas and its tributaries Ammati and Kalamos pass here which, together with the many natural springs, cool down Kallepia and the surrounding regions and provide water for the fruit trees and the vegetables.

References

External links
 http://www.kallepia.org/

Communities in Paphos District